Silicon (14Si) has 23 known isotopes, with mass numbers ranging from 22 to 44. 28Si (the most abundant isotope, at 92.23%), 29Si (4.67%), and 30Si (3.1%) are stable. The longest-lived radioisotope is 32Si, which is produced by cosmic ray spallation of argon. Its half-life has been determined to be approximately 150 years (with decay energy 0.21 MeV), and it decays by beta emission to 32P (which has a 14.28-day half-life) and then to 32S. After 32Si, 31Si has the second longest half-life at 157.3 minutes. All others have half-lives under 7 seconds.

List of isotopes 

|-
| rowspan=2|22Si
| rowspan=2 style="text-align:right" | 14
| rowspan=2 style="text-align:right" | 8
| rowspan=2|22.03579(54)#
| rowspan=2|29(2) ms
| β+ (67.6%)
| 22Al
| rowspan=2|0+
| rowspan=2|
| rowspan=2|
|-
| β+, p (32.4%)
| 21Mg
|-
| rowspan=2|23Si
| rowspan=2 style="text-align:right" | 14
| rowspan=2 style="text-align:right" | 9
| rowspan=2|23.02544(54)#
| rowspan=2|42.3(4) ms
| β+, p (88%)
| 22Mg
| rowspan=2|3/2+#
| rowspan=2|
| rowspan=2|
|-
| β+ (12%)
| 23Al
|-
| rowspan=2|24Si
| rowspan=2 style="text-align:right" | 14
| rowspan=2 style="text-align:right" | 10
| rowspan=2|24.011535(21)
| rowspan=2|140(8) ms
| β+ (62.4%)
| 24Al
| rowspan=2|0+
| rowspan=2|
| rowspan=2|
|-
| β+, p (37.6%)
| 23Mg
|-
| rowspan=2|25Si
| rowspan=2 style="text-align:right" | 14
| rowspan=2 style="text-align:right" | 11
| rowspan=2|25.004109(11)
| rowspan=2|220(3) ms
| β+ (64.8%)
| 25Al
| rowspan=2|5/2+
| rowspan=2|
| rowspan=2|
|-
| β+, p (35.2%)
| 24Mg
|-
| 26Si
| style="text-align:right" | 14
| style="text-align:right" | 12
| 25.9923338(12)
| 2.2453(7) s
| β+
| 26Al
| 0+
|
|
|-
| 27Si
| style="text-align:right" | 14
| style="text-align:right" | 13
| 26.98670469(12)
| 4.15(4) s
| β+
| 27Al
| 5/2+
|
|
|-
| 28Si
| style="text-align:right" | 14
| style="text-align:right" | 14
| 27.9769265350(5)
| colspan=3 align=center|Stable
| 0+
| 0.92223(19)
| 0.92205–0.92241
|-
| 29Si
| style="text-align:right" | 14
| style="text-align:right" | 15
| 28.9764946653(6)
| colspan=3 align=center|Stable
| 1/2+
| 0.04685(8)
| 0.04678–0.04692
|-
| 30Si
| style="text-align:right" | 14
| style="text-align:right" | 16
| 29.973770137(23)
| colspan=3 align=center|Stable
| 0+
| 0.03092(11)
| 0.03082–0.03102
|-
| 31Si
| style="text-align:right" | 14
| style="text-align:right" | 17
| 30.97536319(5)
| 157.36(26) min
| β−
| 31P
| 3/2+
|
|
|-
| 32Si
| style="text-align:right" | 14
| style="text-align:right" | 18
| 31.9741515(3)
| 153(19) y
| β−
| 32P
| 0+
| trace
| cosmogenic
|-
| 33Si
| style="text-align:right" | 14
| style="text-align:right" | 19
| 32.9779770(8)
| 6.18(18) s
| β−
| 33P
| (3/2+)
|
|
|-
| 34Si
| style="text-align:right" | 14
| style="text-align:right" | 20
| 33.978575(15)
| 2.77(20) s
| β−
| 34P
| 0+
|
|
|-
| style="text-indent:1em" |34mSi
| colspan=3 style="text-indent:2em" | 4256.1(4) keV
| <210 ns
| IT
| 34Si
| (3−)
|
|
|-
| 35Si
| style="text-align:right" | 14
| style="text-align:right" | 21
| 34.98455(4)
| 780(120) ms
| β− (94.74%)
| 35P
| 7/2−#
|
|
|-
| rowspan=2|36Si
| rowspan=2 style="text-align:right" | 14
| rowspan=2 style="text-align:right" | 22
| rowspan=2|35.98665(8)
| rowspan=2|450(60) ms
| β− (87.5%)
| 36P
| rowspan=2|0+
| rowspan=2|
| rowspan=2|
|-
| β−, n (12.5%)
| 35P
|-
| rowspan=2|37Si
| rowspan=2 style="text-align:right" | 14
| rowspan=2 style="text-align:right" | 23
| rowspan=2|36.99295(12)
| rowspan=2|90(60) ms
| β− (83%)
| 37P
| rowspan=2|(7/2−)#
| rowspan=2|
| rowspan=2|
|-
| β−, n (17%)
| 36P
|-
| rowspan=2|38Si
| rowspan=2 style="text-align:right" | 14
| rowspan=2 style="text-align:right" | 24
| rowspan=2|37.99552(11)
| rowspan=2|63(8) ms
| β−, n
| 37P
| rowspan=2|0+
| rowspan=2|
| rowspan=2|
|-
| β−
| 38P
|-
| 39Si
| style="text-align:right" | 14
| style="text-align:right" | 25
| 39.00249(15)
| 47.5(20) ms
| β−
| 39P
| 7/2−#
|
|
|-
| 40Si
| style="text-align:right" | 14
| style="text-align:right" | 26
| 40.00583(37)
| 33.0(10) ms
| β−
| 40P
| 0+
|
|
|-
| 41Si
| style="text-align:right" | 14
| style="text-align:right" | 27
| 41.01301(60)
| 20.0(25) ms
| β−
| 41P
| 7/2−#
|
|
|-
| 42Si
| style="text-align:right" | 14
| style="text-align:right" | 28
| 42.01768(54)#
| 12.5(35) ms
| β−
| 42P
| 0+
|
|
|-
| rowspan=3|43Si
| rowspan=3style="text-align:right" | 14
| rowspan=3style="text-align:right" | 29
| rowspan=3|43.02480(64)#
| rowspan=3|13(4 (stat), 2 (sys)) ms
| β−, n (52%)
| 42P
| rowspan=3|3/2−#
| rowspan=3|
| rowspan=3|
|-
| β− (27%)
| 43P
|-
| β−, 2n (21%)
| 41P
|-
| 44Si
| style="text-align:right" | 14
| style="text-align:right" | 30
| 44.03147(54)#
| 4# ms [>360 ns]
|
|
| 0+
|
|

References

External links
Silicon isotopes data from The Berkeley Laboratory Isotopes Project's

 
Silicon
Silicon